Birgit Sippel (born 29 January 1960) is a German politician who has been serving as a Member of the European Parliament (MEP) since 2009. She is a member of the Social Democratic Party, part of the Party of European Socialists.

Political career

Beginnings 
In 1982, Sippel joined the Socialist Youth of Germany "Die Falken", belonging to the International Falcon Movement, and was engaged up to the district level. That same year, she also joined the Social-Democratic Party of Germany (SPD) and was soon involved in the local party branch in Neheim. In 1983, she also joined the German Industrial Union of Metalworkers (IG Metall), in which she served i. a. as employee representative. From 1994 to 2004, she served as member of the city council of Arnsberg for the SPD.

Apart from her commitment at local level, Sippel was member of the SPD's National Council from 1996 to 2010 and, since 2010, has been member of the party's council and presidium in the federal state of North Rhine-Westfalia under the leadership of chairwoman Hannelore Kraft.

Member of the European Parliament, 2009–present 
In the European Parliament, Sippel has been a full member in the Committee on Civil Liberties, Justice and Home Affairs (LIBE), in which she has taken over the office of coordinator of the S&D Group after her re-election in 2014. Furthermore, she is a substitute member in the Committee on Employment and Social Affairs (EMPL) and a member of the Delegation for relations with the Mashreq countries.

On the LIBE committee, Sippel has been involved in diverse topics, touching upon questions of privacy and data protection (e.g. Terrorist Finance Tracking Program, Passenger Name Record data (PNR)) but also upon issues like the EU asylum policy, migration and the Schengen area. In 2020, she became the parliament's rapporteur on legislation combatting child sexual abuse online. Moreover, she has been involved in the advancement of police and judicial cooperation at EU level (Area of Freedom, Security and Justice), e.g. by supporting the adoption of several directives on procedural safeguards. EMPL topics such as public procurement, the Working Time Directive or the Posted Workers Directive have made up additional parts of her daily work.

In addition to her committee assignments, Sippel is a member of the European Parliament Intergroup on LGBT Rights and the European Parliament Intergroup on Western Sahara.

Other activities
 Fair Trials International, Patron
 St. Maria zur Wiese, Member of the Board of Trustees
 IG Metall, Member

References

External links 
 Official Website Birgit Sippel
 Profile Birgit Sippel at European Parliament Website
 Profile Birgit Sippel at the Website of SPD MEPs
 Profile Birgit Sippel at S&D Website

1960 births
Living people
Social Democratic Party of Germany MEPs
MEPs for Germany 2009–2014
MEPs for Germany 2014–2019
MEPs for Germany 2019–2024
People from Bochum
21st-century women MEPs for Germany